Social Behavior and Personality is a peer-reviewed scientific journal covering social, developmental, and personality psychology. It was established in 1973 and is now published monthly by Scientific Journal Publishers Limited. The founding and current editor-in-chief is Robert A. C. (Bob) Stewart (Society for Personality Research). Dr Stewart was previously the editor of Personality: An International Journal. Social Behavior and Personality is published electronic only and is hosted on its own website and on Ingenta Connect. The journal publishes on general topics of social psychology with a strong focus on how these topics link with the areas of health, education and organizations.

History 
The number of  issues per year has grown progressively from two (1973-1990), four (1991-1988), eight (2001-2005), ten (2006-2017), to twelve in 2018. In January 2018, the journal announced that it would move from print and electronic publication to electronic only from 2019.

Abstracting and indexing 
The journal is abstracted and indexed in the Social Sciences Citation Index, Current Contents – Social & Behavioral Sciences, and Scopus.

Social Behavior and Personality is archived in Portico and CLOCKSS, and distributed through the Research4Life Hinari program from the World Health Organization. Reviewers are given recognition through a partnership with Publons, a service that tracks and verifies peer reviews.

According to the Journal Citation Reports, the journal has a 2020 impact factor of 0.976. Scopus reports that the journal has a Citescore of 1.4.

Distribution and business model 
Although distributed by subscription model, SBP Journal has hybrid open access options. Authors can place their published work into an institutional repository. Short research notes are available open access. And authors whose funding requires open access can request that it be applied immediately upon publication.

In 2017, Social Behavior and Personality started to offer advance online publication through the Ingenta Connect Fast Track service.

Social Behavior and Personality charges authors article processing charges (US$529 per 500 words or part thereof), despite also charging subscription fees for most article types.

References

External links

Social psychology journals
Developmental psychology journals
Publications established in 1973
English-language journals
Monthly journals